New Post is a census-designated place (CDP) in the town of Hunter, Sawyer County, Wisconsin, United States. The population was 305 at the 2010 census.

Geography
New Post is located at  (45.903968, -91.178564).

According to the United States Census Bureau, the CDP has a total area of 27.4 square miles (71.0 km2), of which, 20.4 square miles (52.7 km2) of it is land and 7.1 square miles (18.3 km2) of it (25.74%) is water.

Demographics
As of the census of 2000, there were 367 people, 156 households, and 97 families residing in the CDP. The population density was 18.0 people per square mile (7.0/km2). There were 425 housing units at an average density of 20.9/sq mi (8.1/km2). The racial makeup of the CDP was 34.60% White, 65.12% Native American, and 0.27% from two or more races. Hispanic or Latino of any race were 1.63% of the population.

There were 156 households, out of which 25.6% had children under the age of 18 living with them, 41.0% were married couples living together, 16.0% had a female householder with no husband present, and 37.2% were non-families. 32.1% of all households were made up of individuals, and 9.0% had someone living alone who was 65 years of age or older. The average household size was 2.35 and the average family size was 2.94.

In the CDP, the population was spread out, with 24.8% under the age of 18, 7.4% from 18 to 24, 27.0% from 25 to 44, 27.8% from 45 to 64, and 13.1% who were 65 years of age or older. The median age was 39 years. For every 100 females, there were 112.1 males. For every 100 females age 18 and over, there were 115.6 males.

The median income for a household in the CDP was $29,219, and the median income for a family was $28,000. Males had a median income of $23,750 versus $21,528 for females. The per capita income for the CDP was $12,395. About 11.1% of families and 16.0% of the population were below the poverty line, including 23.6% of those who are under age 18 and 13.1% of those age 65 or over.

References

Census-designated places in Sawyer County, Wisconsin
Census-designated places in Wisconsin